Metal-Expo is an international exhibition for steel producers, users, as well as manufacturers and suppliers of steel processing equipment. It has been held yearly since 1995 in Moscow at the All-Russia Exhibition Centre. 

Metal-Expo Co. Ltd. is a full member of the Global Association of the Exhibition Industry (UFI), Russian Union of Exhibitions and Fairs, and Russian Union of Metal and Steel Suppliers. The company is an associate member of The Russian Union of Industrialists and Entrepreneurs (RSPP). Metal-Expo exhibition is endorsed by The Ministry of Industry and Trade of the Russian Federation, The International Union of Metallurgical Equipment Producers (Metallurgmash), Russian Union of Metal and Steel Suppliers, and Russian Chamber of Commerce and Industry.

On the average more than 700 exhibitors from 35 world countries participate Metal-Expo exhibition. Annually more than 30 000 professionals in all segments of the steel and related industries including machine-building, transportation, logistics, metalworking, stockholding etc. visit the event. All the major Russian, CIS, European, and Asian steel companies traditionally participate in Metal-Expo. More than 4,000 professionals work on the stands during the event.

The program of events of the exhibition includes some 60 conferences, seminars, presentations, and round tables on all the aspects of the steel business with more than 500 speakers.

Segments
Metal-Expo consists of 15 major segments of the steel and related industries:
 Ferrous industry: manufacturing process and products of the ferrous industry (billets, long products, flats, tubes and pipes)
 Non-ferrous industry: manufacturing process and products of the non-ferrous industry (raw materials, secondary metals, semi-finished products, rolled products, and profiles)
 High conversion products: tubes and pipes, coated sheets, metal and steel products, special steels and alloys etc.
 Equipment and technologies for the steel and mining industries.
 Raw materials for the metal and steel industries (iron ore, ferroalloys, non-ferrous metal ores, coke etc.)
 Ferrous and non-ferrous scrap collecting and recycling.
 Transportation and logistics, stocking in steel industry and metal and steel trading.
 Equipment and technologies for warehouses and steel service centers.
 Sheet metal and long products processing: cutting, shaping, bending, and welding.
 Welding materials, equipment and technologies.
 Refractory materials, technical ceramics for the steel industry and foundry.
 Scientific research and developments in the ferrous and non-ferrous industries as well as nanotechnologies.
 Mass media, IT technologies, online-trading, automation of industrial processes and business for the steel industry and metalworking.
 Ecology in the steel industry, labor protection and safety.
 Financing, investments, insurance, leasing.

Other projects of Metal-Expo, JSC 
 MetallStroyForum International Exhibition for Steel Products and Structures for Construction
 MetallurgMash International Exhibition for Equipment and Technologies for Steel Industry and Metalworking
 MetallTransLogistik International Exhibition for Transportation and Logistics for Mining and Metallurgical Complex
 SteelStructures International Specialized Exhibition for Steel Structures Designers, Manufacturers, as well as Suppliers of Equipment for Steel Structures Production     
 Metallurgy.Litmash, Tube. Russia, Aluminium/Non-Ferrous, international industrial exhibitions for the ferrous and non-ferrous industries, tubes and pipes, equipment, and technologies

References

External links
 Metal-Expo
 MetallStroyForum
 Metallugry.Litmash, Tube.Russia, Aluminiu/Non-Ferrous

Trade fairs in Russia
Exhibition of Achievements of National Economy
Steel industry of Russia